Nebria hellwigii is a species of ground beetle in the Nebriinae subfamily that is endemic to Greece.

References

External links
Nebria heydenii at Carabidae of the World

heydenii
Beetles described in 1830
Beetles of Europe
Endemic fauna of Greece